Käravete is a small borough in Järva Parish, Järva County, central Estonia. As of 2011 Census, the settlement's population was 234.

References

External links
Järva Parish 

Boroughs and small boroughs in Estonia
Kreis Jerwen